Savda is a city and a municipal council in Jalgaon district in the Indian state of Maharashtra. It is also known as Banana City for production of bananas at a good scale.

Geography 
It has an average elevation of 231 metres (757 feet).

Demographics

At the 2011 India census, Savda had a population of 20,584. Males constitute 52% of the population and females 48%. Savda has an average literacy rate of 72%, lower than the national average of 74.5%: male literacy is 78%, and female literacy is 65%. In Savda, 13% of the population is under 6 years of age. Freedom Fighters from Savda had fought in the Quit India Movement of 1942.

References 

 

Cities and towns in Jalgaon district